Placopterus is a genus of checkered beetles in the family Cleridae. There are at least four described species in Placopterus.

Species
These four species belong to the genus Placopterus:
 Placopterus cyanipennis (Klug, 1842)
 Placopterus haagi (Chevrolat, 1876)
 Placopterus subcostatus (Schaeffer, 1917)
 Placopterus thoracicus (Olivier, 1795)

References

Further reading

External links

 

Clerinae
Articles created by Qbugbot